Tomorrow Never Knows is a compilation album of songs by the English rock band the Beatles, released on 24 July 2012 through the iTunes Store. The album was conceived to highlight the band's influence on the history of rock music and bring together many of the Beatles' most influential rock songs. It is named after the Revolver album track "Tomorrow Never Knows", which is featured on the compilation.

Release
Tomorrow Never Knows was released as an iTunes Store exclusive, in partnership with EMI Records and the Beatles' own Apple Corps, upon the approval of Paul McCartney, Ringo Starr and the Board of Directors representing the estates of John Lennon and George Harrison. The release coincided with a streaming and downloadable promotional film for the song "Hey Bulldog".

Tributes
The album's release was accompanied by several written tributes from contemporary rock acts praising the band. Ex-Nirvana drummer and Foo Fighters frontman Dave Grohl wrote, "If it weren't for the Beatles I would not be a musician. It's as simple as that". Citing the gritty distorted guitar, rolling bass line, Ringo's drum fills and the groove of the song "Hey Bulldog", Grohl described it as "a quintessential Beatles rocker... raw and real".

Win Butler of Arcade Fire theorised that "There is a straight line from James Brown to death metal and it runs through 'Helter Skelter.' The primal edge to the singing on certain Beatles songs was present all along—from 'Twist and Shout' onwards. It's that edge in the voice that, to me, makes rock n' roll. I've always thought of them as heavy". Mark Stoermer of the Killers further opined that "With 'Helter Skelter', the Beatles rocked harder than Led Zeppelin ever did, one year before their first album came out".

Ben Bridwell from Band of Horses praised "She Said She Said", stating "Cheers to all involved on this track. Ringo Starr should be commended for the absolutely mental drums playing. The time signature alone is difficult to understand but to think of this performance being captured boggles my mind".

Adam Levine of Maroon 5 observed that "The Beatles are a massive part of who I am. My mother lived and breathed the Beatles and they were a huge part of my upbringing. Every time we went anywhere the Beatles were playing on the stereo. That seeped into my consciousness and completely shaped my musical style". Mike Shinoda of Linkin Park added "Nearly everything my band knows about how to approach recording a song is attached to the Beatles in some way".

Track listing
All songs written by Lennon–McCartney, except tracks 5 and 10, by George Harrison.
"Revolution" – 3:25
"Paperback Writer" – 2:19
"And Your Bird Can Sing" – 1:59
"Helter Skelter" – 4:31
"Savoy Truffle" – 2:54
"I'm Down" – 2:32
"I've Got a Feeling" (Let It Be... Naked mix) – 3:38
"Back in the U.S.S.R." – 2:44
"You Can't Do That" – 2:35
"It's All Too Much" – 6:26
"She Said She Said" – 2:36
"Hey Bulldog" – 3:11
"Tomorrow Never Knows" – 2:59
"The End" (Anthology 3 mix) – 2:52

Charts

References

2012 compilation albums
Albums produced by George Martin
Albums recorded at Apple Studios
Albums recorded at Trident Studios
Apple Records compilation albums
Capitol Records compilation albums
Compilation albums published posthumously
EMI Records compilation albums
ITunes-exclusive releases
The Beatles compilation albums